Gaj is a village in Serbia. It is situated in the Kovin municipality, in the South Banat District, Vojvodina province. The village has a Serb ethnic majority (79.31%) and its population numbering 3,302 people (2002 census).

Historical population

1961: 3,532
1971: 3,701
1981: 3,661
1991: 3,432

Major ethnic groups

References
Slobodan Ćurčić, Broj stanovnika Vojvodine, Novi Sad, 1996.

See also
List of places in Serbia
List of cities, towns and villages in Vojvodina

Populated places in Serbian Banat
Populated places in South Banat District
Kovin